The Wild Goose is a 1921 American silent drama film directed by Albert Capellani and written by Gouverneur Morris. The film stars Mary MacLaren, Holmes Herbert, Dorothy Bernard, Joseph W. Smiley, Norman Kerry, and Rita Rogan. The film was released on June 5, 1921, by Paramount Pictures.

It is preserved in the Library of Congress collection as a 35mm nitrate print.

Cast 
Mary MacLaren as Diana Manneers
Holmes Herbert as Frank Manners 
Dorothy Bernard as Mrs. Hastings
Joseph W. Smiley as Mr. Hastings
Norman Kerry as Ogden Fenn
Rita Rogan as Tam Manners
Lucia Backus Seger as Nou Nou

References

External links 

 
 

1921 films
1920s English-language films
Silent American drama films
1921 drama films
Paramount Pictures films
Films directed by Albert Capellani
American black-and-white films
American silent feature films
1920s American films